San Sperate, Santu Sparau in Sardinian language, is a comune (municipality) in the Province of South Sardinia in the Italian region Sardinia, located about  northwest of Cagliari.

San Sperate borders the following municipalities: Assemini, Decimomannu, Monastir, Sestu, Villasor.

Demographic evolution

References

External links 

 www.sansperate.net

Cities and towns in Sardinia